Chiara Mastalli (born 2 August 1984 in Rome) is an Italian film and television actress.

She gained recognition for her role as Eirene in the HBO/BBC/RAI original television series Rome.

Biography

Born in Rome in 1984, in 2001 she shoots the short film Ten Minutes Older - The Cello, while in 2003 she appears on the big screen with a small part in the film Remember Me, My Love and in the role of Nina in Men & women, love & lies.

Career

In 2008 she returned to the cinema screens with the film Amore, bugie e calcetto, directed by Luca Lucini, and on the small screen with Un caso di coscienza. She is also the protagonist, together with Lorenzo Balducci, of the TV movie Così vanno le cose. In 2009 she appeared again with the miniseries L'isola dei segreti - Korè and I liceali 2. In 2010 she graduated in Marketing & Advertising at LUMSA, winning a scholarship.

Filmography

Cinema
Ten Minutes Older: The Cello (2001)
Tre metri sopra il cielo (2003)
Uomini Donne Bambini e Cani (2003)
Notte prima degli esami (2005)
Notte prima degli esami – Oggi (2007)
Un fantastico via vai (2013)

Television 
Sei forte maestro (2000)
Carabinieri (2002)
Casa famiglia (2002)
Padri e Figli (2003)
Il Maresciallo Rocca 5 (2005)
Simuladores (2005)
Rome (2005)
L'amore spezzato (2005)
Codice rosso (2005)
I Liceali 2 (2009)
L'Allieva (2016-2020)

References

External links

Chiara Mastalli agency profile

1984 births
Living people
Actresses from Rome
Italian film actresses
Italian stage actresses
Italian television actresses